Tourism and Hospitality Research is a quarterly peer-reviewed academic journal covering the field of hospitality management. The editor is Marina Novelli (University of Brighton). It was established in 2004 and is published by SAGE Publications.

Abstracting and indexing
The journal is abstracted and indexed in Scopus.

External links

SAGE Publishing academic journals
English-language journals
Tourism journals
Publications established in 1980
Quarterly journals
Hospitality management